Special agent is a title for a detective or investigator.

Special Agent may also refer to:
Special Agent (1935 film), an American drama film directed by William Keighley
Special Investigator (film), a 1936 American western film starring Richard Dix
Special Agent (1949 film), an American film directed by William C. Thomas
Special Agent (album), a 1981 folk album by Martin Simpson
Special Agent Oso, a 2009 Disney television series
 Special Agent, a subsidiary label under St. Lawrence records, which produced Barbara Acklin's first record